Wealdenbatrachus is an extinct genus of prehistoric frog known from the Lower Cretaceous of Uña, Spain, which is part of the La Huérguina Formation Its anatomy and relationships have recently been revisited, finding that this frog might be a proficient jumper, and that it was a primitive frog close to the ancestry of all modern frogs.

See also

 Prehistoric amphibian
 List of prehistoric amphibians

References

Cretaceous frogs
Cretaceous amphibians of Europe
Cretaceous Spain
Fossils of Spain
La Huérguina Formation
Fossil taxa described in 1988